Su-1 or SU-1 may refer to: 

Sukhoi Su-1, prototype fighter
Stevens SU-1, glider